Thrush Aircraft, Inc. is an American aircraft manufacturer based in Albany, Georgia. It currently manufactures the Thrush series of agricultural aircraft.

History
Rockwell International originally built the facility in 1965 and operated it until it was purchased by Ayres Corporation on 23 November 1977.  In July 2001, Ayres filed for bankruptcy and the rights to the S-2 aircraft were passed to Quality Aerospace. In 2003, the factory was purchased by Larry Bays and Payne Hughes, and one month later Quality Aerospace transferred the type certificates of the S-2 to Thrush Aircraft. In 2005, the company had 150 employees. By 2013, this had increased to 185.

The 510 was introduced in 2009. The first two examples of the 510G Switchback, a variant designed for firefighting were delivered to the Georgia Forestry Commission in 2017.

The company entered bankruptcy protection in September 2019 for the second time, intending to restructure and emerge in a better financial position. The company laid-off 113 employees as part of the process. As a result of the restructuring, Mark McDonald was named CEO.

Aircraft

See also
 Snow Aeronautical

References

External links
 

Aircraft manufacturers of the United States
Dougherty County, Georgia